Nishana is a 1980 Indian Hindi-language action film, produced by M. Arjuna Raju, A. S. R. Anjineelu under Roja Movies banner and directed by K. Raghavendra Rao. Starring Jeetendra, Poonam Dhillon  and music  composed by Laxmikant–Pyarelal. The film is remake of the Telugu film Vetagadu (1979). Both the movies are made by same banner & director. The film partly inspired the 2010 comedy Housefull.

Plot 
Thakur Pratap Singh and his wife Janki Devi belongs to a rich and royal dynasty. Ananda Bhupathi constructs a huge palace in the middle of a forest, next day of the palace opening ceremony Gruhapravesam their Diwanji tries to kidnap Janki Devi for an ancestral Rajkamal Necklace which is always worn by Gayatri Devi, very precious and expensive. But Janki Devi somehow escapes from him and secretly gives the necklace to an Adivasi and tells him to wear the necklace on their goddess statue and do not give it to anyone until she comes back. Surya Prakash who belongs to another royal dynasty, is a close friend to Thakur Pratap Singh tries to save Janki Devi, but he is brutally killed by Diwanji. And they create a story that Surya Prakash has taken away Janki Devi for the Rajkamal necklace. Then onward there develops a rivalry between both families. After 25 years Kavita, daughter of Thakur Pratap Singh and Raja, who is the son of Surya Prakash meet in a forest trip and falls in love with each other. But as her father learns that he is the son of Surya Prakash he disagrees with the marriage. Rest of the story is how Raja proves his father's innocence by formulating various plans.

Cast 
The cast is as follows:
Jeetendra as Raja
Poonam Dhillon as Kavita
Prem Chopra as Premee
Asrani as Ganesh
Shreeram Lagoo as Thakur Pratap Singh
Utpal Dutt as Diwanji
Rajendra Nath as Bansilal
Pradeep Kumar as Surya Prakash
Om Shivpuri as Adivasi
Jayshree Gadkar as Janaki Devi
Mohan Choti
Jayshree T.

Soundtrack 
Lyrics: Anand Bakshi

Reception and legacy 
Upon release, in November, Sunday reported the film to be in the third place among the biggest hits of the week. According to Box Office India, the final verdict of the film's box-office performance is "below average". The film was touted by the same newspaper to be among a new wave of Hindi films made by filmmakers from South India, which "revitalised the production of Hindi extravaganzas at Madras". Film World magazine was critical of the pairing between Jeetendra and Dhillon and warned the latter that "One more film like Nishana and there you will be in the dumps". Author Manisha Mishra accused the film of colourism in a 2021 research paper.

Film director Sajid Khan said that the film "has stayed with me for three decades now", and that it subconsciously inspired him while writing the script of the 2010 comedy Housefull.

References

External links 

1980 action films
1980 films
1980s Hindi-language films
Films directed by K. Raghavendra Rao
Films scored by Laxmikant–Pyarelal
Films set in forests
Hindi remakes of Telugu films
Indian action films
1980s masala films